Clayton Daniels, previously Clayton Jagers, (born 10 July 1984) is a South African soccer player who plays for Cape Town Spurs as a defender.

He was born in Bishop Lavis on the Cape Flats.

Honours

Club

SuperSport United
 Nedbank Cup: 2016, 2017
MTN 8: 2017, 2019
Telkom: 2014

References

External links
 
 

1984 births
Living people
Sportspeople from Cape Town
Cape Coloureds
South African soccer players
Association football defenders
Cape Town Spurs F.C. players
Mamelodi Sundowns F.C. players
Bloemfontein Celtic F.C. players
SuperSport United F.C. players
Maritzburg United F.C. players